Beverly Kills 50187 is the first EP by American hip hop group Insane Clown Posse, released in 1993 by Psychopathic Records. It is the first "sideshow" entry in the group's Dark Carnival saga. The group felt that they should release EPs in between their studio albums during the Dark Carnival saga, in order to build and satisfy their fanbase. It is the 2nd overall release by Insane Clown Posse.

Beverly Kills 50187 features the only appearance of temporary member Greez-E, who appears on "In the Haughhh!" and "17 Dead". Original member John Kickjazz, Shaggy 2 Dope's brother, left the group shortly before the release of Carnival of Carnage and Greez-E, a fan ICP met earlier that year, then joined as John's replacement. Greez-E would leave after the release of this EP. The answering machine message at the end of "The Stalker" is an actual message left by an ex-boyfriend who was stalking Violent J's then-girlfriend. The cover art, like the group's "Joker's Card" albums, was drawn by Shaggy 2 Dope. This is also the first time 2 Dope began calling himself Shaggy in their music.

Track listing

Personnel 
 Violent J – vocals
 Shaggy 2 Dope – vocals, turntables
 Greez-E – vocals
 Esham – guest vocals
 Mike E. Clark – turntables, production, music composer, instrumentals
 Daniel Lynch - turntables, back-up vocals, production
 Lazaras Saumell - production, lighting, roadie

References 

1993 debut EPs
Albums produced by Esham
Albums produced by Mike E. Clark
Self-released albums
Insane Clown Posse EPs
Psychopathic Records EPs